Al-Muqaabarat is a village in northern Syria located west of Homs in the Homs Governorate. According to the Syria Central Bureau of Statistics, Al-Muqaabarat had a population of 607 in the 2004 census. Its inhabitants are predominantly Christians. The village has two Greek Orthodox Churches. Al-Muqaabarat includes Haret Mar Doumat, Haret Mahfoud and Haret Jerjes.

References

Bibliography

 

Populated places in Talkalakh District
Christian communities in Syria